Jeremy German Rosado (born March 24, 1992) is an American singer from Valrico, Florida. He placed thirteenth on the eleventh season of American Idol.

Early life
Rosado graduated from Durant High School in 2010.  He went to  Hillsborough Community College where he worked as a front desk clerk at an infectious diseases doctor's office. His musical influences are Francesca Battistelli, Kirk Franklin and Israel Houghton.

American Idol
Rosado auditioned for American Idol four times in a row prior to the eleventh season. Jennifer Lopez has dubbed him as "Jer-Bear."

In the semi-finals, Rosado performed "Gravity" by Sara Bareilles.  He was not one of the top five vote getters but was one of the six contestants selected to perform in the wild card round.  In the wild card round, he performed "I Know You Won't" by Carrie Underwood, was one of the three contestants selected to be a wild card, and advanced to the top 13.  In the top 13, he performed Stevie Wonder's "Ribbon in the Sky". He was the lowest male vote getter and went against Elise Testone as the lowest female vote getter. The judges chose to save Testone and Rosado was eliminated from the competition. He is the first male and fourth wild card finalist to be eliminated first in the finals.

Performances/results

Post-Idol
After the show, Jeremey Rosado appeared on Live! with Kelly on March 12, 2012, the Today show the next day, and Good Morning America. His first single, "Don't Be Afraid", was released on April 2, 2013. His first studio album, Heartbeat, was released on August 28, 2015, by Save the City Records.

As of August 2016, Rosado has been the worship leader for Free Life Chapel in Lakeland, Florida. In 2021, Rosado competed on Season 21 of USA's The Voice, as part of Kelly Clarkson's team. He was eliminated in the fourth week of the Live Shows.

Rosado signed a recording contract with Capitol Christian Music in 2022.

References

External links
 Official website
 Jeremy Rosado on American Idol
 

1992 births
21st-century American singers
American Idol participants
The Voice (franchise) contestants
Living people
Singers from Florida
People from Valrico, Florida
21st-century American male singers
Durant High School (Florida) alumni